Dailín Belmonte Torres (born October 15, 1985) is a Cuban long-distance runner who specialises in marathon running. She won two medals at the 2009 Central American and Caribbean Championships in Athletics and was fourth at the 2011 Pan American Games. She has a personal best of 2:38:08 hours for the marathon, set at the 2012 Summer Olympics.

Biography
Belmonte began to establish herself on the track in 2003, when she ran a national junior record of 35:20.14 minutes for the 10,000 metres. The 2005 ALBA Games was hosted in Havana and she ran in both the 5000 metres and the 10,000 m, picking up bronze and silver medals respectively. She made her half marathon debut in Havana in February 2007 and ran a time of 76:48 minutes. She won another track silver at the 2007 ALBA Games in the 10,000 m and won the 5000 m at the Barrientos Memorial. In November she won the Marabana half marathon. She stepped up to the marathon distance in running a time of 2:47:56 hours in February,

Belmonte ran a half marathon best of 74:11 minutes in February 2009, then moved up to fourth on the Cuban all-time lists with a run of 2:39:57 hours in Santa Clara, Cuba. At the 2009 Central American and Caribbean Championships in Athletics, held in Havana, she topped the half marathon podium and claimed second in the 10,000 m behind fellow Cuban Yudileyvis Castillo. She ended her season with a half marathon win at the Marabana. She was the 5000 m champion at the Barrientos Memorial in 2010. In the marathon that year, she won at the Olimpiada del Deporte Cubano and was runner-up at the Panama City Marathon.

She completed a half marathon/10,000 m double at the 2011 ALBA Games in Barquisimeto. Her best marathon time of the season came in Artemisa, where she won in 2:41:57 hours. She gained her selection for the 2011 Pan American Games and she came fourth in that race, behind Peru's Gladys Tejeda. She was fourth at the 2012 Madrid Marathon and her time of 2:41:07 was enough to gain a place on the Cuban Olympic team.  She ran a personal best at the 2012 London Olympics, placing 69th. She finished 102nd at the 2016 Olympics.

Achievements

References

Living people
1985 births
Cuban female long-distance runners
Cuban female marathon runners
Sportspeople from Santiago de Cuba
Athletes (track and field) at the 2012 Summer Olympics
Athletes (track and field) at the 2016 Summer Olympics
Olympic athletes of Cuba
Pan American Games competitors for Cuba
Athletes (track and field) at the 2011 Pan American Games
Athletes (track and field) at the 2015 Pan American Games
Athletes (track and field) at the 2019 Pan American Games
World Athletics Championships athletes for Cuba
Competitors at the 2018 Central American and Caribbean Games
Central American and Caribbean Games silver medalists for Cuba
Central American and Caribbean Games medalists in athletics
20th-century Cuban women
20th-century Cuban people
21st-century Cuban women